WTTB (1490 kHz) is a commercial AM radio station licensed to Vero Beach, Florida, and serving the Treasure Coast.  It broadcasts a talk radio format, calling itself "Newsradio 105.7 and 1490."  The station is owned by Treausure & Space Coast Radio with the license held by Vero Beach Broadcasters, LLC.

WTTB is powered at 1,000 watts, non-directional.  It is also heard on 250 watt FM translator W289CF at 105.7 MHz in Vero Beach.

Programming
While most of WTTB's programming is nationally syndicated talk shows, there are two local hours each weekday featuring Treasure Coast news and information, at 8 a.m. and 6 p.m.  Hosts heard on WTTB include Sean Hannity, Glenn Beck, Brian Kilmeade, Dan Bongino, Jim Bohannon, Doug Stephan, "America in The Morning" and "Coast to Coast AM with George Noory."  Weather is supplied by WPTV Channel 5.

History
WTTB is one of the oldest radio stations along the Treasure Coast. Although it is widely believed the station's slogan, Where the tropics begin, originated with WTTB, Dr. John Leroy Hutchison has been credited for coining the phrase back in the 1920s–nearly three decades before WTTB went on the air. The phrase was used in the 2009 television series pilot for CBS's Harper's Island.

During the 1960s, 70s and 80s, the station featured a full service, middle of the road format of popular music, news and sports.  By the 1990s, it had ended its music programs and became all-talk.

References

External links

TTB
Radio stations established in 1954
1954 establishments in Florida